Lecheng Bridge was a large stone arch bridge in Sanxi Town of Jingde County, Anhui, China. It was known as "the Second Oldest Stone Bridge in Southern Anhui".

History
Lecheng Bridge was originally built in 1543, in the 22nd year of Jiajing period of the Ming dynasty. In early Qing dynasty, it was damaged by catastrophic floods and was rebuilt in the reign of Kangxi Emperor. It had been designated as a provincial level cultural heritage by Anhui Provincial Government in 2004. On July 6, 2020, Lecheng Bridge was destroyed by floods.

References

Stone bridges in China
Arch bridges in China
Bridges in Anhui
Ming dynasty architecture
Qing dynasty architecture
Buildings and structures destroyed by flooding